Tomás Mosciatti is a Chilean radio host and political commentator of Radio Bío Bío.

He was the firstborn of the matrimony of Nibaldo Mosciatti Moena, a journalism businessman from Concepción and the lawyer Olga Olivieri Aste.

In July 2020 Mosciatti was sued by Eugenio González for libel.

References

Living people
Chilean radio journalists
Chilean people of Italian descent
People from Concepción, Chile
1960 births
Chilean political commentators